Events from the year 1671 in Ireland.

Incumbent
Monarch: Charles II

Events
January 18 – Royalist Sir Richard Talbot petitions King Charles II on behalf of the Catholic nobility and gentry.
March 13 – the Parliament of England addresses the King against the growth of popery.
April 22 – Navigation Act passed by the Parliament of England prohibits direct imports from the English colonies to Ireland.
May 26 – John O'Molony is appointed Roman Catholic Bishop of Killaloe.
June 10 – the King permits Sir George Hamilton to raise a regiment for service in France.
August 1 – Prince Rupert of the Rhine heads his first commission into land settlement in Ireland.
August 4 – Viscount Ranelagh undertakes to manage revenues of the Crown in Ireland.
December 5 – Royal charter granted to The King's Hospital (Blue Coat School) in Dublin.

Births
Jonathan Smedley, religious opportunist and satirical victim who engaged in polemic with Jonathan Swift and the Tory party (d.1729)

Deaths
January – Dubhaltach Mac Fhirbhisigh, scribe, translator, historian and genealogist (murdered).
April – William Caulfeild, 1st Viscount Charlemont (b. 1624)
June – William St Lawrence, 12th Baron Howth (b. 1628)
October - Samuel Mather (Independent minister) (b. 1626 in England) - nonconformist minister

References

 
1670s in Ireland
Ireland
Years of the 17th century in Ireland